Dongbaek station is a station on the Busan Metro Line 2 in U-dong, Haeundae District, Busan, South Korea. The station is located near the Dongbaekseom Island.

External links 

Busan Metro stations
Haeundae District
Railway stations opened in 2002